Alcides Edgardo Ghiggia Pereyra (22 December 1926 – 16 July 2015) was a Uruguayan-Italian football player, who played as a right winger. He achieved lasting fame for his decisive role in the final match of the 1950 World Cup, and at the time of his death exactly 65 years later, he was also the last surviving player from that game.

Career
Ghiggia's family was of Ticinese descent, originally from Sonvico. He played for the national sides of both Uruguay and Italy during his career. He also played for Peñarol and Danubio in Uruguay and A.S. Roma and A.C. Milan in Italy.

In 1950, Ghiggia, then playing for Uruguay, scored the winning goal against Brazil in the final match of that year's World Cup. Roberto Muylaert compares the black and white film of the goal with Abraham Zapruder's chance images of the assassination of John F. Kennedy in Dallas: he says that the goal and the shot that killed the U.S. president have "the same dramatic pattern ... the same movement ... the same precision of an unstoppable trajectory. They even have the dust in common that was stirred up, here by a rifle and there by Ghiggia's left foot." The match is considered one of the biggest upsets in football history; Ghiggia would later remark that "only three people managed to silence the Maracanã: Frank Sinatra, the Pope, and me."

He managed Peñarol in 1980.

On 29 December 2009, Brazil honoured Ghiggia by celebrating his decisive goal in the 1950 World Cup. Ghiggia returned to Maracanã Stadium almost 60 years later for this honour and planted his feet in a mould to take his place alongside greats including Brazil's Pelé, Portugal's Eusébio and Germany's Franz Beckenbauer on the Maracanã's walk of fame. Ghiggia was very emotional and thanked Brazil for the warm reception and recognition he received even when the game is considered the most disappointing in Brazilian football history.

Later years
Ghiggia lived out his last years at his home in Las Piedras, Uruguay. He died on 16 July 2015 in a private hospital in Montevideo at the age of 88. Coincidentally, it was the 65th anniversary of the Maracanazo. At the time of his death, Ghiggia was the oldest living World Cup champion.

Ghiggia was the last surviving member from either the Brazilian or Uruguayan squads involved in the historic 1950 World Cup game.

Honours

Club
Peñarol
Primera División: 1949, 1951
Roma
Fairs Cup: 1960–61
 Milan
Serie A: 1961–62

International
FIFA World Cup: 1950

Individual
FIFA World Cup All-Star Team: 1950
Golden Foot: 2006 (as a legend)
A.S. Roma Hall of Fame: 2014

References

External links

!colspan="3" style="background:#C1D8FF;"| World Cup-winners status
|-
|  style="width:25%; text-align:center;"| Preceded byPietro Rava
|  style="width:50%; text-align:center;"| Oldest Living Player 22 February 2004 – 16 July 2015 
|  style="width:25; text-align:center;"| Succeeded byHans Schäfer

futbol.com.uy

1926 births
2015 deaths
Uruguayan footballers
Uruguayan expatriate sportspeople in Italy
Italian footballers
Italy international footballers
Uruguayan Primera División players
Serie A players
Peñarol players
Danubio F.C. players
A.S. Roma players
A.C. Milan players
Uruguay international footballers
FIFA World Cup-winning players
1950 FIFA World Cup players
Dual internationalists (football)
Uruguayan emigrants to Italy
Uruguayan people of Italian descent
Uruguayan people of Swiss-Italian descent
Citizens of Italy through descent
Uruguayan football managers
Peñarol managers
Footballers from Montevideo
Association football wingers
Burials at Cementerio del Buceo, Montevideo